Weather systems are patterns of weather.

Weather systems may also refer to:

 Weather Systems (Anathema album)
 Weather Systems (Andrew Bird album)